The International School of Milan (ISM) is an international school and IB World School in the northern part of Milan, Italy. The school was the first fully authorised institution in Italy to offer all three of the programmes of the  International Baccalaureate: Primary Years Programme, Middle Years Programme and Diploma Programme, for students aged 2 to 19.

The International School of Milan is the largest and oldest school in a group of International Schools in Italy run by the Inspired Group: the others are Monza, Modena, Siena and Bergamo although there are many other schools within the organization's global network. It has a partner school in Aliso Veijo, California, and supports educational projects in India, Zambia, Cambodia, Ethiopia as well as local projects. In addition, the school is part of a range of international school organizations and networks. The school is the largest and oldest international curriculum school in Milan and sends graduates to universities in the UK, US, Italy and all over the world.

History
Founded in 1958, the school initially offered the British O Levels/GCSE and A Levels. The International Baccalaureate was gradually adopted as the main curriculum after the Italian government recognized the IB as equivalent to the Maturità (the Italian equivalent of A Levels) during the late 1980s to early 1990s. The British curriculum is no longer taught and ISM is solely an IB World School.

In September 2013, the school opened a brand-new purpose-built campus in Baranzate, northwest of Milan which united the Primary, Middle and High School sections of the school.

International School of Europe
The network was founded in 2008. ISM, as well as its sister schools in Monza (1984), Rome (1988) and Modena (1998), are part of the network. In 2010, ISE opened another school in Siena as part of a joint venture with Novartis Vaccines, Monte Dei Paschi and the provincial government of Siena.

References

External links

 School Website

International schools in Milan
International Baccalaureate schools in Italy